Miguel Ernesto Chacón Sosa (born October 8, 1983) is a male professional road cyclist from Venezuela.

Career

2004
 in Pan American Championships, Track, Team Pursuit, Elite, San Carlos Tinaquillo
 in Pan American Championships, Road, U23, San Carlos Tinaquillo
1st in Stage 3 Vuelta a Venezuela (VEN)
2005
1st in Stage 3 Vuelta a Cuba, Bayamo (CUB)
1st in Stage 3 part b Vuelta a Venezuela, Barquisimeto Circuit Av. Venezuela (VEN)
1st in Stage 9 Vuelta a Venezuela, Valle La Pascua (VEN)
1st in Stage 2 Clasico Ciclistico Banfoandes, Ciudad Bolivia (VEN)
2nd in General Classification Vuelta al Estado Zulia (VEN)
2007
1st in Stage 1 Vuelta a Venezuela, Aracataca (COL)
2009
1st in Stage 3 Vuelta al Estado Portugesa, Piritu circuito (VEN)
1st in Stage 4 Vuelta al Estado Portugesa, Acarigua (VEN)

References
 
Venezuelan cyclists

1983 births
Living people
Venezuelan male cyclists
Vuelta a Venezuela stage winners
Place of birth missing (living people)
Central American and Caribbean Games silver medalists for Venezuela
Competitors at the 2006 Central American and Caribbean Games
Central American and Caribbean Games medalists in cycling